Saad Lamjarred (born 7 April 1985) is a Moroccan singer-songwriter, multi-instrumentalist, dancer, record producer and actor. His official music video for "LM3ALLEM" has received over 1 billion views on YouTube; he has had over 4 billion views and 14 millions subscribers on his YouTube channel, making him the best-selling Arab music artist of all time.

On 24 February 2023, a court in Paris convicted him to 6 years in prison for rape. Lamjarred denied the charge, claiming that he did not penetrate the victim, and has appealed the decision in court.

Early life
Lamjarred was born to Bachir Abdou, a Moroccan classical singer, and Nezha Regragui, an actress and comedian.
From an early age, Lamjarred had a special interest in playing the piano, as well as singing as early as the age of four.

Lamjarred then went on to study at the Conservatory of Music in Rabat, where he studied music, art theory and dance. He would perform many productions wherein he would collaborate with his father.

Lamjarred moved to the US in 2001 and cites this as one of the main sources of inspiration for his music, crediting the experience for exposing him to western music and having a defining effect on his style and the type of artist he wanted to identify as.

Career
In 2007, Lamjarred took part in Super Star, a widely popular Arab talent TV show, and was placed second in season 4 of the series that was defeated by the Tunisian Marwan Ali. His participation earned him recognition.

In 2011, Lamjarred started his acting career, playing the male lead in Ahlam Nassim, a Moroccan soap opera. He released an album in 2013, titled Wala Aalik. That same year, he released two more EPs, namely Salina and Enty. The title song of the latter, "Enty", became one of Lamjarred's biggest hits and earned him an award at the Méditel Morocco Music Awards 2014, as well as a nomination for the Best Middle East Act at the 2014 MTV Europe Music Awards.

Lamjarred was also nominated for the Best Middle East Act at the 2014 MTV Europe Music Awards. He won the Murex d'Or in the category of "Best Arabic Song" for his 2014 song "Enty".

The music video for Lamjarred's 2015 hit single, "Lm3allem", earned a Guinness World Record achievement after garnering 1 billion views on YouTube within three months of release.

A year later, Lamjarred released another single titled "Ana Machi Sahel", which he soon followed up with a black-and-white music video released on YouTube that features dozens of Lamjarred's fans, who have filmed themselves singing along to the song at home, in their cars and out and about. Lamjarred didn't wait too long to release another single by the name of "Ghaltana" in the form of a video clip directed by Amr Rouani. The video caught eyes because of its Wild West, gritty feel, inspired by Rouani's childhood love of Mad Max films.

Following this success, Lamjarred's music production took a brief gap while he was on trial in Paris for sexual assault, but soon made a come-back with his August 2017 comeback titled "Let Go". It was an immediate hit, it earned about half a million views on YouTube within an hour of its release. Lamjarred later released new hit songs such as "Ghazali", another big hit that earned more than half a million views only minutes after the video went live at an average of 50 thousand views every five minutes. "Ghazali" was then succeeded by "Casablanca", in which Lamjarred sings in French.

August 2018 saw Lamjarred incarcerated once more in Saint Tropez, halting his music career again until December 2018, in which he released another single, titled "Baddek Eih". Within 4 hours of publication, the official music video received over a million views on YouTube.

In July 2019, Lamjarred performed and released a duet with Egyptian actor and fellow singer Mohamed Ramadan titled "Ensay", which garnered over 100 million views within a month of publication.

On 10 June 2020 Lamjarred reached 10 million subscribers on his official YouTube channel, and becoming the first Arab African singer to get the Diamond Button. In May 2022, his 2015 hit single "Lm3allem" became the first Arabic song to surpass a billion views on YouTube.

Personal life
There were reports in the media that Lamjarred was once married, and divorced around 2015.

On 11 September 2022, he announced his engagement to businesswoman Ghita El Allaki. They married later in the same month.

Rape allegations and investigations
In February 2010 while visiting the United States, Saad Lamjarred was accused of beating and raping a woman from Brooklyn, New York. Lamjarred fled the U.S. after posting bail and was in risk of being arrested if he returned. The case was dropped in 2016, after the accuser "stopped cooperating with prosecutors" and reached a settlement in a lawsuit.

Lamjarred was arrested at the Marriott Champs Elysées at the 17th arrondissement of Paris on 25 October 2016, where he appeared before a French prosecutor to face the charges about an alleged sexual assault against a French woman. He was scheduled to perform at the Palais des congrès de Paris on 29 October 2016. Lamjarred was released in April 2017, but still faced charges. In early 2017, he was "prohibited from performing in public, traveling and speaking to media". The King of Morocco, Mohammed VI, helped him cover his fees and hire a legal team. In 2017, a French-Moroccan woman accused him of sexual misconduct and abuse at an apartment in Casablanca, Morocco, back in 2015. She later withdrew the complaint "under pressure from her family".

On 26 August 2018 he was once again arrested in Saint-Tropez on a new rape allegation in France. Lamjarred, who has denied the allegations, was released on a bail of 150,000 euros and could not leave France. His release on bail was later appealed by the Parquet of Draguignan (public prosecutor). On 18 September 2018 he was incarcerated in France following a decision of the cour d'appel (court of appeal) from Aix-en-Provence. On 20 November 2018 it was announced that he had been cleared of rape charges, but would be tried for "crimes of sexual assault and willful violence". On 6 December 2018 it was announced that French authorities had released Lamjarred on a conditional release and that he was awaiting trial. His Moroccan passport was confiscated, he was not allowed to leave France and he had to report to the nearest precinct once a week.

In December 2018, he was released from jail after serving his sentence, but was unable to leave France until August 2019. In April 2019, the judge overseeing the case from October 2016 "redefined" the charges against him due to lack of evidence to prove him guilty and referred his case to the criminal court. On 18 December 2019 he had his first public concert in Riyadh after three years. Days before the concert, a number of Saudi users on Twitter expressed their disapproval of Lamjarred's upcoming concert in the country's capital.

In January 2020, the investigative chamber of the Paris Court of Appeal referred the case from October 2016 to the court of assizes. In April 2020, The Paris Court of Cassation annulled the decision made by the investigative chamber as "the code of criminal procedure was not respected and referred the case back to the criminal court.

On 24 February 2023, a court in Paris found Lamjarred guilty of rape by seven votes out of nine (in accordance with French criminal law), and sentenced him to 6 years in prison. Lamjarred denied the charge, claiming that he did not penetrate the victim. He added that he and the victim had kissed and undressed consensually, and that his only violent act was pushing her face away reflexively after she scratched his back, an act which he claims to regret. According to journalist Marine DelaMoisssoniere, the court was convinced that penetration took place, despite the fact that traces of Lamjarred's DNA were only found on the victim's clothes. The court supported its decision also with testimonies of personnel working at the hotel. He was arrested and tranferred to prison immediately after the verdict, which garnered protest from his legal defense. Later Lamjarred appealed the court decision, maintaining his innocence.

Reactions
Following the third allegation, a campaign started on the social media with the hashtags "Lamjarred out" and "masaktach" (Moroccan Arabic expression meaning "I won't be silenced"), with the users demanding that his songs being taken off the radio stations. 2M and Hit Radio were among the first to take his songs off the airways, with the latter saying that they would ask their listeners whether they should keep the ban permanent or not. In September 2018, after a campaign on social networks, some Moroccan media stopped their broadcast of Lamjarred's songs.

Since 2020, Lamjarred has come under fire from feminists who have attempted—with different degrees of success—to stop him from performing. This movement started in particular in Egypt. Egyptian feminists also campaigned against Saad Lamjarred's presence in Egypt, with three major campaign waves in 2020, 2021, and 2022. In 2020 on Twitter and Facebook, thousands of Egyptians started a campaign demanding the "Cairo Show" Theatre to cancel Saad Lamjarred's show. The opponents effectively cancelled his concert in December 2020, and an appearance on the Egyptian talk show Sahranin in 2021, but his December 2022 concert took place despite viral campaigns against it.

In 2022 similar campaigns continued to be held in Egypt, Iraq and Lebanon.

Discography

Albums

Singles
 2009: "Waadini" (واعديني)
 2012: "Salina Salina" (سلينا سلينا)
 2014: "Enty" (أنتي)
 2015: "Lm3allem" (لمعلم)
 2016: "Ana Machi Sahel" (أنا ماشي ساهل)
 2016: "Ghaltana" (غلطانة)
 2017: "Let Go"
 2018: "Ghazali" (غزالي)
 2018: "Ya Allah" (يا الله)
 2018: "Casablanca"
 2018: "Baddek Eih" (بدك ايه)
 2019: "Njibek" (نجيبك)
 2019: "Ykhalik Lili" (يخليك للي)
 2019: "Salam" (سلام)
 2019: "Daba Tzian" (دابا تزيان)
 2020: "Adda Elkalam" (عدى الكلام)
 2021: "Lghadi Wehdou" (الغادي وحدو)
 2021: "Nadi Ya Allah" (نادي يا الله)
 2022: "Ya Ayouni" (يا عيوني)
 2022: "Altawbah" (التوبة)
 2022: "Ma Ahla Lmakan" (ما أحلى المكان)
 2022: "Alacheq Alhayem" (العاشق الهايم)
 2022: "El Hala'" (الحلق)

Duets
 2012: "Aziz W Ghali" (عزيز وغالي) – feat. Bachir Abdou
 2012: "Sa'aa Saaida" (ساعة سعيدة) – feat. Sofia Mountassir
 2014: "Wana Ma'ak" (وأنا معاك) – feat. Asma Lamnawar
 2014: "Ya Ensan" (يا إنسان) – feat. Salah Alkurdi
 2019: "Ensay" (إنساي) – feat. Mohamed Ramadan
 2020: "Asef Habibi" (آسف حبيبي) – feat. Fnaïre
 2020: "Chidde W Betzul" (شدت وبتزول) – feat. Salah Kurdi
 2020: "Bab Alrajaa" (باب الرجاء) – feat. Mohamed Reda
 2021: "Lewjah Tani" (لوجه التاني) – feat. Zouhair Bahaoui
 2021: "Sahra Sabahi" (السهرة صباحي) – feat. RedOne and Saber Rebaï
 2021: "Enty Hayaty" (انتي حياتي) – feat. Calema
 2022: "Min Awel Dekika" (من أول دقيقة) – feat. Elissa
 2022: "Viva El Rey Habibna" (عاش حبيبنا الملك) – feat. Nicolas Reyes

Charted songs

Filmography
Television
 2012: Ahlam Nassim

Awards and nominations

References

External links
 

1985 births
Living people
People from Rabat
21st-century Moroccan male singers
Moroccan pop singers
Moroccan Muslims
Moroccan male film actors
Moroccan male television actors